Cyprinus daliensis is a species of ray-finned fish in the genus Cyprinus. It is endemic to Lake Erhai in Dali, Yunnan. It has not been recorded since the 1960s and is possibly extinct.

Footnotes 

 

Cyprinus
Endemic fauna of Yunnan
Freshwater fish of China
Fish described in 1977